Yanuca Levu (pronounced ) is an island in Fiji's Lomaiviti group.

The local chief is the Turaga na Tunimata, who is also a descendant of the priests of Moturiki.

The island is believed to contain sources of oil and other minerals.

Islands of Fiji
Lomaiviti Province